The Substitute is an American reality television program that aired on Nickelodeon from April 1, 2019 to February 25, 2021. The program features pranks and celebrities going undercover as substitute teachers to surprise students, with $25,000 donations being made to each school they visit. The series was renewed for a second season hosted by Juanpa Zurita.

Production 
On February 14, 2019, it was announced that The Substitute would be a part of Nickelodeon's 2019 slate. The program is a production of The Intellectual Property Corporation, Eli Holzman, and Aaron Saidman, with Mike Harney serving as showrunner. On March 20, 2019, it was announced that the program would premiere on April 1, 2019, with Jace Norman guest starring in the premiere. A sneak peek of the first episode aired immediately following the 2019 Kids' Choice Awards on March 23, 2019. On May 6, 2019, it was announced that Lilly Singh would guest star in an episode airing on May 18, 2019. On August 28, 2019, it was announced that Nickelodeon ordered a full series pickup of The Substitute, with a 10-episode order for an October 2019 premiere. On September 18, 2019, it was announced that John Cena would guest star in an episode airing on October 4, 2019. On November 15, 2019, it was revealed that Ne-Yo would guest star in a holiday episode airing on November 30, 2019.

On January 17, 2020, it was revealed that Brie and Nikki Bella would guest star in an episode airing on January 31. It was also revealed that additional guest stars for future episodes would include Rico and Raini Rodriguez, Asher Angel, Shaun White, JoJo Siwa, Johnny Orlando, Kel Mitchell, and Cooper Barnes.

On October 23, 2020, it was announced that a second season would premiere on October 31 with Ariel Martin, Chloe Kim, and Chris Paul among the guest stars in the season. The season also added a new host, Juanpa Zurita.

Episodes

Series overview

Season 1 (2019–20)

Season 2 (2020–21)

Special (2020)

Ratings 
 

| link2             = #Season 2 (2020–21)
| episodes2         = 12
| start2            = 
| end2              = 
| startrating2      = 0.27
| endrating2        = 0.23
| viewers2          = |2}} 
}}

References

External links 
 
 

2010s American reality television series
2010s Nickelodeon original programming
2019 American television series debuts
2020s American reality television series
2020s Nickelodeon original programming
2021 American television series endings
American children's reality television series
English-language television shows